Shahivand Ali Morad (also Romanized as Shāhīvand ʿAlī Morād; also known as Shāhīvand) is a village in Zirtang Rural District, Kunani District, Kuhdasht County, Lorestan Province, Iran. At the 2006 census, its population was 33, in 7 families.

References 

Towns and villages in Kuhdasht County